Robert Meek Carter (1814–1882) was a British coal merchant and Liberal politician.

In 1850 he was elected to Leeds council as a Chartist, and was reelected in 1853. In 1868 he was elected as a Member of Parliament for Leeds, a position he held until his resignation in 1876.

References

Portrait at Berkshire Record Office

External links 
 

1814 births
1882 deaths
Liberal Party (UK) MPs for English constituencies
UK MPs 1868–1874
UK MPs 1874–1880
Chartists